The 2015–16 LSU Tigers basketball team represented Louisiana State University during the 2015–16 NCAA Division I men's basketball season. The team's head coach was Johnny Jones, who was in his fourth season at LSU. They played their home games at the Pete Maravich Assembly Center in Baton Rouge, Louisiana, as a member of the Southeastern Conference. They finished the season 19–14, 11–7 in SEC play to finish in a three-way tie for third place. They defeated Tennessee in the quarterfinals of the 2016 SEC tournament to advance to the semifinals where they lost to Texas A&M. On March 13, the day after losing to Texas A&M by 33 points, they announced they would not participate in a postseason tournament.

Previous season and offseason
LSU completed the 2014–15 season with an overall record of 22–11 and 11–7 in SEC play to finish in a four-way tie for third place in the final SEC standings. They lost in the quarterfinals of the SEC tournament to Auburn. The Tigers received an at-large bid to the NCAA tournament where they lost in the second round to NC State.

Departures

incoming transfers
 Craig Victor II, transfer from Arizona.

Class of 2015 signees

Roster

Schedule and results

|-
!colspan=12 style="background:#461D7C; color:white;"| Exhibition

|-
!colspan=12 style="background:#461D7C; color:white;"| Regular season

|-
!colspan=12 style="background:#461D7C;"| SEC Tournament

Source:

See also
2015–16 NCAA Division I men's basketball season

References

External links
2015–16 LSU Tigers basketball team at ESPN

LSU Tigers basketball seasons
Lsu
LSU
LSU